Jan Bamert (born 9 March 1998) is a Swiss footballer who plays for Swiss Challenge League club Thun, as a centre-back.

Club career
On 22 August 2022, Bamert signed a three-year contract with Thun.

References

1998 births
Footballers from Zürich
Living people
Association football defenders
Swiss men's footballers
Switzerland youth international footballers
Switzerland under-21 international footballers
Grasshopper Club Zürich players
FC Sion players
FC Thun players
Swiss 1. Liga (football) players
Swiss Super League players
Swiss Promotion League players
Swiss Challenge League players